Conner Hill is a summit in Oregon County in the U.S. state of Missouri.

The peak lies just east of the Eleven Point River and north of Riverton.

Conner Hill has the name of George Conner, a pioneer citizen.

References

Landforms of Oregon County, Missouri
Hills of Missouri